Vans Valley is an unincorporated community in Delaware County, in the U.S. state of Ohio.

History
A post office called Vans Valley was established in 1849, and remained in operation until 1899. The community was named for Gilbert Van Dorn, a pioneer settler.

References

Unincorporated communities in Delaware County, Ohio
Unincorporated communities in Ohio